5Star (stylized as 5STAR) is a British free-to-air television channel owned by Channel 5 Broadcasting Limited , a wholly-owned subsidiary of Paramount Global, which is grouped under Paramount Networks UK & Australia division. It originally launched as the female-orientated Five Life on 15 October 2006, and was relaunched as Fiver on 28 April 2008 with a revised version of the same concept. The channel later re-branded as 5star on 7 March 2011, and later to its current name on 11 February 2016. The network focuses on documentaries, comedy and drama, with a range of original content such as Rich Kids Go Skint and Young, Dumb & Banged Up in the Sun, along with some American and Australian imports.

History

2006–08: Five Life

The channel was intended to be a female-orientated channel with an emphasis on lifestyle programming. Channel 5 announced that programming on launch would include The Ellen DeGeneres Show, Love My Way, Windfall, Angela's Eyes, and a weekday double-bill of the chat show Trisha Goddard. On 16 October 2006, a day following the channel's launch, Australian soap opera Home and Away began airing from episode 4212 (Season 19, Episode 112). New episodes are shown Monday to Friday in a 'First Look' screening with episodes following the Channel 5 airing. Repeats of popular female-skewing dramas, both nationally and internationally produced, were soon acquired. Following the channel's launch, a time-shift version of the channel was launched in summer 2007.

2008–11: Fiver
Five Life was repositioned and relaunched as Fiver in April 28, 2008 while still targeting female audiences, the channel was re-positioned with a "younger, faster, louder" concept, meant to compete with Sky Living. On-air presentation reflected this shift with a "cursor" motif, typing out words reflecting programs and current events.

2011–16: 5star
In 2011, the channel was re-launched again, as 5star (stylized as 5★ or 5*, pronounced "Five Star"). The new brand focused on a "fun-loving" concept, with initial acquisitions including $#*! My Dad Says, Better with You and Parenthood. On 11 April 2011, 5star reduced its broadcast hours to 13:00 to 00:00, replacing the hours withdrawn with more teleshopping. When some of these new programs failed to make much of an impact in the channel's ratings, several were dropped and replaced by new locally produced and acquired programming. These included the American series 8 Simple Rules, 10 Things I Hate About You, Alphas and The Lying Game.

In 2012, in consort with C5's acquisition of the series, 5star began airing the Big Brother companion show Big Brother: Live from the House, which aired 60 minutes of live feed following every eviction show. In 2013, after Live from the House set ratings records for the channel, the programme was expanded to two hours nightly. However, ratings were at a share below that of the channel's average, with just 70,000 watching the first live feeds. Subsequently, the live feeds were shut down and the spin-off show last aired in June 2013. Also in 2013, American Idol moved to 5star from ITV2. Continuing the channel's venture into reality based programming, Tallafornia was acquired from Ireland's TV3 and this was soon joined by Bar Rescue, World's Worst Tenants and Top 20 Funniest in 2014.

The 5star schedule included a variety of programming, including the aforementioned reality series, as well as the first-run rights to Helix, the second-run rights to American series Falling Skies, Under the Dome and The Walking Dead, and Australian soap operas Home & Away and Neighbours. Popular documentary series shared with C5 air throughout the daytime and primetime hours, such as The Gadget Show.

The time-shift version of the channel was shut down on 3 February 2014 to make way for Channel 5 +24. The channel returned later, launching on Freesat on 16 September 2014 and Sky in the UK and Ireland on 4 November 2014, replacing BET +1 on the platform. The addition of the channel in Ireland was an error, thus it was removed on 6 November 2014.

On 11 February 2016, as part of an overall re-branding of Channel 5's networks following their acquisition by Viacom, the channel was re-branded as 5Star.

2016 to date: 5Star
After initially being positioned as a younger skewing channel (in a manner similar to E4), 5Star has dropped a lot of its drama and comedy programmes from the schedules and replaced them with blocks of reality TV programming with medical shows such as Skin A&E, 999: Critical Condition and Don't Tell The Doctor showing on Thursday nights in September 2021, and nights devoted to crime and cleaning showing on other days.

The channel still had a number of drama shows listed in its schedules for 2021 with imports such as Departure and Wentworth: The Final Sentence broadcast after the watershed and its Australian soaps still broadcast in an hour block from 6pm (though the 3pm repeat has been replaced by episodes of Police Interceptors from Paramount Network). Also 5Star picked up the free-to-air television rights of streaming series The Act (from StarzPlay via Amazon) which increased its viewing figures on 5Star with each episode broadcast, and Dirty John (also available on Netflix).

Australian soap opera Home & Away is a programme which has episodes debuting on the channel before being repeated on Channel 5, with other channel premieres including episodes of Killer at the Crime Scene and The Nightmare Neighbour Next Door, as well as a number of romcom films shown at lunchtime. 5Star have usually decided to schedule feature films each Friday, Saturday and Sunday night, with the whole Saturday daytime schedule usually given over to family films. However, the quality of some of the films broadcast by 5Star has been picked up by Kermode and Mayo's Film Review on BBC Radio 5 Live, who have nominated many titles due to be broadcast on the channel, for their 'TV Movie So Bad it's Bad' feature on the show.

On 20 October 2021, their scheduled Love at Lunchtime TV movie premiere slot was discontinued and replaced by back-to-back repeats of various emergency services documentaries with episodes 6 and 7 of Traffic Cops replacing the already announced premiere of Love's Last Resort on that date.

Programmes debuting new episodes on the channel in November 2021 included Filthy House SOS and Oxford Street 24/7, while Nick Knowles' Better Homes is a new show from the presenter of Channel 5's Big House Clearout and Our Secret World was a new commission produced by Viacom Studios UK, featuring Babestation stars like Atlanta Moreno and Jess West enjoying their leisure time in a reality TV format. New-to-Freeview episodes of drama series The Act (from American streaming service Hulu), are debuting weekly on 5Star at 10pm on a Thursday night before being repeated late night on 5Select a few days later.

From 8 November 2021, after Ofcom approved an hour-long 5 News at 5 on the main channel to fit in Eggheads at 6.30pm, the early evening repeat of Home and Away moved to 5Star, with the Australian soap now being broadcast in an hour-long slot from 6pm, with the repeat scheduled back-to-back with the 'first look' episode (though the soap went on its regular winter break on Monday 22 November, with the slot being used for repeats of Shoplifters & Scammers: At War with the Law and family films, until a new episode of the soap was broadcast on New Year's Eve).

On 4 December 2021, 5Star begin repeating season 11 of Judge Judy in the mornings, at the same time that season 17 was seen on CBS Reality and, due to a simulcast agreement, nine Local TV channels in the UK. A month later, on 4 January 2022, more retro programming from the archives of ViacomCBS appeared on the network, when Zalman King's Red Shoe Diaries (originally broadcast on the American Showtime channel in 1992 and then on Channel 5) started a repeat run in the United Kingdom on 5Star.

Ratings
The launch of Five Life was at the time ranked as the worst received multichannel launch for a terrestrial broadcaster, only managing to achieve a primetime share of 0.21%.
Following the channel's relaunch as Fiver in 2008, the all-day share for the channel has been between 0.5–0.6%. The highest rated series airing on the channel are Home & Away, Neighbours and the weeknight showings of primetime movies. The highest rating for the channel is held by Big Brother: Live from the House, when it received just over one million viewers and an audience share of over five percent in 2013.

Current programming: 5Star

First–run

 The Act (2021)
 Adults Only (2020–present) (also repeated on Channel 5 and MTV in 2021, and known under the title XXXmas over the festive period)
 Ambulance: Code Red (2020–present)
 Bargain Brits on Benefits (2022–present)
 Cold Case Killers (2021–present)
 Dirty John (2021)
 Don't Tell The Doctor (2017–present)
 Drag Kids (also known as Kids in Drag: We're Fabulous!) (2019–present)
 Entertainment News (2020–present)
 Extreme Hair Wars (2018–present)
 Filthy House SOS
 Get Your Tatts Out: Kavos Ink (2017–present)
 Greatest Ever Movie Blunders (2018–present) (this series was re-edited as a new one-off show for broadcast on Channel 5 in November 2021)
 Greatest Ever TV Blunders (2018–present)
 Home and Away (16 October 2006 – present) (first look)
 Impact Wrestling (2019–present)
 Inside The Mind... (2021) (a celebrity documentary with Dr Bob Johnson)
 It's Your Fault I'm Fat (2019–present)
 Killer at the Crime Scene (2021–present)
 Nick Knowles' Better Home (2021)
 Old School For Lazy Kids (2019–present)
 Our Secret World (2021)
 Oxford Street 24/7 (2021) (a previous series was broadcast first on Channel 5)
 Plastic Surgery Knifemares (2019)
 Prison Life (2018–present)
 Rich Kids Go Homeless (2019–present)
 Rich Kids Go Skint (2018–present)
 Rich Kids, Skint Holiday (2019–present)
 Secret Admirer (2018–present)
 Sex Pod (2016–present)
 Skin A&E (2021–present)
 Top 20 Funniest (2014–present)
 Tower Block Kids (2018–present)
 The Shocking Truth About Food (2019–present)
 Undercover Twins (2019)
 When Kids Kill (2016–present)
 When Teens Kill (2018–present)
 World's Wildest Holidays (2018–present)
 Young, Dumb & Banged Up in the Sun (2018–present)

Second–run

 Bargain-Loving Brits in the Sun
 Britain's Parking Hell (2018–present)
 Casualty 24/7: Every Second Counts
 Fights, Camera, Action! (previously shown on Paramount Network)
 Departure (2021)
 Judge Judy (episodes from 2006–2007, that were previously shown on various CBS branded channels)
 Police Interceptors
 Red Shoe Diaries (episodes from 1992, that were previously shown on Channel 5)
 Suits (season 8 in 2022)
 Supermarket Wars
 Ten Years Younger In Ten Days (2021, Channel 5 series only)
 The Town the Gypsies Took Over: Appleby Horse Fair (repeated on 5Star on 3 January 2022)
 Wentworth Prison (2016–2021) (this drama debuted in the UK as a Channel 5 show before becoming an exclusive-to-5Star title during its fourth season)
 The World's Most Expensive Hotels

Former programming: 5Star

First–run

 100% Hotter (2016–)
 Access (2011–2020) (replaced by Entertainment News)
 Airport 24/7: Thailand (2019–present) (moved to Paramount Network)
 Baby Ballroom (2017–)
 Baby Faced Mums (2016–)
 Badass Brides (2017–)
 Bad Teen to Ballroom Queen (2018–)
 Britain's Naughtiest Nursery (2019–)
 Celebrity Ghost Hunt (2017–)
 Celeb Road Trip: Lost in Transylvania (2018–)
 Celebs on the Farm (2018–present) (moved to MTV)
 Celebs on the Ranch (2019–)
 Channel Zero (2016–)
 Clink (2019–)
 Dirty Tricks (2019–)
 Sing It On (2016–)
 Strip Date (2016–)

Second–run

 3rd Rock from the Sun (2019–present)
 Will & Grace (2018–present)
 Gilmore Girls (2013–present)
 Falling Skies (2013–present)
 Under the Dome (2013–present)
 16 and Pregnant (2015–present)
 Catfish: The TV Show (2015–present)
 Teen Mom (2015–present)
 American Horror Story (2015–present)
 My Wife and Kids (2015–present)
 That '70s Show (2015–present)
 Dance Moms (2016–present)
 Teen Wolf (2015–present)
 Finding Carter (2017–present)
 Dance Squad (2017–present)
 The Fresh Prince of Bel-Air (2017–present)
 According to Jim (2017–present)
 8 Simple Rules (2011, 2017–present)
 Two and a Half Men (2018–present) (Seasons 1–8 only)
 Smallville (2019–present)
 Empire (2017–present)
 Riverdale (2018–present)
 Celebrity Big Brother (2017) (first look episode on Saturdays)
 Aftermath (2016)
 Heroes Reborn (2016)
 The Magicians (2016–2018)
 The Shannara Chronicles (2016–2017)
 You're the Worst (2016–present)
 Emerald City (2017)
 Fresh Off the Boat (2017–2019)
 Star (2017–2018)
 Last Man Standing (2018–2020)
 House (2020)
 Neighbours (2008–2022)

Former programming: Fiver and 5*

 Angela's Eyes (2006)
 The Ellen DeGeneres Show (2006–2007, 2008)
 Love My Way (2006–2007)
 Sofia's Diary (2008–2009)
 The Trisha Goddard Show (2006–2010)
 Windfall (2006)
 Trust Me - I'm a Beauty Therapist (2006)
 Dawson's Creek (2006–2009)
 Bad Girls (2007–2009)
 Footballers' Wives (2007–2010)
 Step It Up and Dance (2007)
 Fifth Gear (2007–2010)
 Stylista (2007–2008)
 Make Me a Supermodel Extra (2007–2008)
 Colin and Justin's How Not to Decorate (2007)
 My Name Is Earl (2013–2015) (moved to 5USA)
 Gay, Straight or Taken? (2008)
 Nice House, Shame About the Garden! (2008–2010)
 Ocean Force (2008–2010)
 Celebrity Rehab (2009)
 Joey (2009)
 Big Love (2009)
 Farmer Wants a Wife (2009–2010)
 Minder (2009)
 Dirt (2009–2011)
 Sex and the City (2009–2013)
 Almost Live from Studio Five (2009)
 Out of the Blue (2009–2010)
 Rich Bride, Poor Bride (2009)
 Vets in Action (2009–2011)
 The Wright Stuff (2009–2011)
 Better with You (2010)
 Parenthood (2010–2011)
 Pingu (2017–2018)
 Floogals (2017)
 $#*! My Dad Says (2010–2011)
 Malcolm in the Middle (2011–2013) (now on Comedy Central)
 Chuck (2011–2012)
 Archer (2011–2014)
 10 Things I Hate About You (2011)
 Alphas (2011–2012)
 Californication (2011–2012)
 The Lying Game (2012–2013)
 The Walking Dead (2012–2014) (moved to 5Spike)
 Tallafornia (2014)
 BAMMA (2013–2015) (moved to 5Spike)
 Bar Rescue (2014–2015) (moved to 5Spike)
 World's Worst Tenants (2014–2015)
 Eye Candy (2015)
 Helix (2014) (moved to 5Spike)
 Scrubs (2015–2016) (moved from Viva)
 Ridiculousness (2015–2017)
 SpongeBob SquarePants (2017)
 South Park (2017)
 Big Brother: Live from the House (2013, 2015)
 Big Brother's Bit on the Side (2013, 2015)
 Celebrity Big Brother: Live from the House (2013, 2015)
 Celebrity Big Brother's Bit on the Side (2013, 2015)

Notes
  Several documentary series shared with Channel 5 air on 5Star. However, the titles that come to 5Star change too sporadically to pinpoint what specifically airs first-run or second-run to the channel.

Former logos

References

External links
 

Channel 5 (British TV channel)
English-language television stations in the United Kingdom
Television channels and stations established in 2006
Television channels in the United Kingdom
2006 establishments in the United Kingdom